Victoria the Great is a 1937 British historical film directed by Herbert Wilcox and starring Anna Neagle, Anton Walbrook and Walter Rilla. When Laurence Housman's play Victoria Regina was banned by the Lord Chamberlain (in 1935 the royal family could not be shown on the British stage), its subsequent Broadway success prompted King Edward VIII to commission producer Herbert Wilcox to turn it into a film, commemorating the centenary of Victoria's reign. The film biography of Queen Victoria concentrates initially on the early years of her reign with her marriage to Prince Albert and her subsequent rule after Albert's death in 1861. It was released in the year of King George VI's coronation, which was also the centennial of Victoria's own accession to the throne. The movie was so successful that a sequel appeared the following year, Sixty Glorious Years.

Plot
In June 1837, 18-year-old Princess Alexandrina Victoria of Kent ascends the throne as Queen Victoria following the death of her uncle, King William IV. She soon shows her independence from the influence of her German mother, the Duchess of Kent, and her Belgian advisor, Baron Stockmar.

Lord Melbourne, her trusted Prime Minister, tells her he is growing old and she needs an advisor. He suggests she marry her German cousin Prince Albert of Saxe-Coburg and Gotha. Victoria considers Albert too straitlaced and serious, while he thinks she is frivolous, self-willed, overly talkative and too fond of dancing. Victoria decides to postpone inviting Albert and his older brother Ernest to visit, but when Melbourne informs her that Albert does not want to come, she immediately changes her mind and insists he come.

Britain does not make a favourable first impression on Albert and Ernest; their passage across the English Channel is rough and rain-drenched. When they are first presented to the Queen, Albert is not very friendly. Later, at a ball, Albert tells Ernest they are returning home the next day, but after a waltz with Victoria (the orchestra conducted by Johann Strauss), he cancels that plan. In the meantime, Victoria has decided to marry Albert, but he cannot propose to a sovereign, so she must do it herself.

After their marriage, Victoria devotes herself to government, leaving Albert with nothing to do. He chafes at his idleness. When Sir Robert Peel talks to Victoria about the merits of an income tax with Victoria during a party, Albert tries to join the discussion, only to be rebuffed by his wife. When Albert finally rebels, Victoria is unsympathetic at first, but then gives in and lets him participate in governing. She grows to rely on him.

During the social unrest and depression of the "Hungry Forties", Albert spots a would-be assassin and shields his wife during an open-carriage ride. The man only manages to shoot Albert's hat before being overpowered.

In November 1841, Victoria and Albert's first male child, Prince Albert Edward, is born.

After an angry mob gathers outside the palace demanding bread, Victoria and Albert support Peel in repealing the Corn Laws.

In 1861, the Trent Affair threatens to bring the United Kingdom in on the side of the South in the American Civil War. Lord Palmerston, the Foreign Minister, is strongly in favour of a strong message to the United States, but Victoria insists otherwise, and Albert rewrites it so that hostilities are avoided.

That same year, Albert dies. Grieving, Victoria goes into seclusion, eventually resulting in public discontent with the monarchy. Finally, Prime Minister William Gladstone pleads with her to resume her public duties, asking her what Albert would have wanted. At this point, the film switches from black and white to colour, as she heeds Gladstone's advice.

Cast
 Anna Neagle as Queen Victoria
 Anton Walbrook as Prince Albert
 Walter Rilla as Prince Ernest
 H. B. Warner as Lord Melbourne
 Mary Morris as Duchess of Kent
 James Dale as Duke of Wellington
 Felix Aylmer as Lord Palmerston
 Charles Carson as Sir Robert Peel
 Gordon McLeod as John Brown
 C. V. France as Archbishop of Canterbury
 Arthur Young as William Gladstone
 Greta Schröder as Baroness Lehzen
 Paul Leyssac as Baron Stockmar
 Derrick De Marney as Younger Disraeli
 Hugh Miller as Older Disraeli
 Percy Parsons as President Abraham Lincoln
 Hubert Harben as Lord Conyngham
 Henry Hallett as Joseph Chamberlain
 Clarence Blakiston as Duke of Sussex

Critical reception
Variety wrote, "Not cloak-and-cocked-hat historical tedium of pageantry and fancy dramatics, Victoria the Great travels a long way towards a full and clarified explanation of the most popular ruler England ever had...Anna Neagle, in the title role, gives an unwavering performance throughout. Anton Walbrook as Albert, the Prince Consort, is superb...The film wisely puts its prime focus on the private life of Victoria, her romance, marriage, and personal characteristics. Backgrounded is her public life, and her gradual rise to such high estimation of her people. Victoria the Great is done with a lavish hand – the closing sequence is in Technicolor [shot by William V. Skall]. The tinting isn’t too good, but serves effectively as a pointer-up for the climax." ; and more recently, the Radio Times wrote, "It's all fairly tame, and a long way from the rough ride given to the royals of today. Yet Neagle's sympathy for the monarch shines through, and the final reel, which bursts into glorious Technicolor for the Diamond Jubilee, is a delightful piece of patriotic pomp."

References

Bibliography
The Great British Films, pp39–41, Jerry Vermilye, 1978, Citadel Press,

External links
 
 
 
 Victoria the Great at Virtual History

1930s historical films
1937 films
British biographical films
British black-and-white films
British historical films
Cultural depictions of Queen Victoria on film
Cultural depictions of Arthur Wellesley, 1st Duke of Wellington
Films shot at Denham Film Studios
Films directed by Herbert Wilcox
Films partially in color
1930s biographical films
Films set in 1837
Films set in 1841
Films set in 1861
Cultural depictions of Albert, Prince Consort
1930s British films